Wing is an unincorporated community in Covington County, Alabama, United States.

Location 
Wing has a post office with ZIP code 36483.

References

Unincorporated communities in Covington County, Alabama
Unincorporated communities in Alabama